Hoech'ang County is a kun (county) in South P'yŏngan province, North Korea.

History
Before 1945, most of the territory that now comprises Hoech'ang, was part of neighbouring Sŏngch'ŏn county. In 1952 four townships from Sŏngch'ŏn (Sungin-myŏn, Kuryong-myŏn, Rungjung-myŏn, and Taegok-myŏn) and one from Koksan (Pongmyŏng-myŏn) were split from their counties and merged to form Hoech'ang County.

Administrative divisions
The district is split into 1 ŭp (town), 4 rodongjagu (workers' districts) and 17 ri (villages):

References 

  Detailed map
  County information

External links

Counties of South Pyongan